Dagmar Danekova (born  in Žilina) is a Slovak weightlifter, competing in the 53 kg category and representing Slovakia at international competitions. 

She participated at the 2000 Summer Olympics in the 58 kg event. She competed at world championships, most recently at the 2001 World Weightlifting Championships.

Major results

References

External links
 
 http://www.olystats.com/individual_profile.php?AID=24307
 https://www.sme.sk/c/39858/danekova-je-trojnasobnou-medailistkou.html

1978 births
Living people
Slovak female weightlifters
Weightlifters at the 2000 Summer Olympics
Olympic weightlifters of Slovakia
Sportspeople from Žilina